Heterochyta asteropa is a moth in the family Xyloryctidae. It was described by Edward Meyrick in 1906. It is found in Australia, where it has been recorded from Queensland.

The wingspan is about 33 mm. The forewings are fuscous, very finely sprinkled with whitish points, with some scattered whitish scales. The discal stigmata are ochreous white. The hindwings are pale grey.

References

Heterochyta
Moths described in 1906
Taxa named by Edward Meyrick